Reverend John Ntim Fordjour is a Ghanaian politician and member of the Seventh Parliament of the Fourth Republic of Ghana representing the Assin South Constituency in the Central Region on the ticket of the New Patriotic Party. He currently serves as the Deputy Minister of Education following his appointment by Nana Addo Dankwa Akufo-Addo and receiving Parliamentary approval.

Career 
He is the current Deputy Minister of Education and the Member of Parliament for Assin South Constituency of the Parliament of Ghana, Chairman of the Ghana-Canada Parliamentary Friendship Association, Vice Chairman of the Parliamentary Committee on Members Holding Offices of Profit as well as a Member of Parliament Select Committee on Foreign Affairs. He is the Senior Pastor of VBCI Higher Heights Sanctuary in East Legon.

Early life and education 
Fordjour was born on 28 May 1986 and hails from Assin Kruwa in the Central Region of Ghana. He attended Assin Manso Senior High School. He has a multi-disciplinary background in Mining, Economic Policy and International Relations, Ntim Fordjour is currently a PhD Candidate at the Department of Political Science of the University of Ghana. He graduated with a bachelor's degree in Mineral Engineering from University of Mines and Technology (UMaT), Tarkwa in 2007, and subsequently was awarded a Master of Arts Degree in Economic Policy Management by University of Ghana in 2014.

Politics 
Fordjour is a member of the New Patriotic Party.

In the 2016 elections,  he obtained 23,308 votes out of the 39,887 valid votes cast representing of  58.99% votes to become the member of parliament for Assin South Constituency.

He is currently the vice chairperson for the  members Holding Offices of Profit Committee and also a member of the Foreign Affairs Committee in parliament. John Ntim Fordjour is a Member of the Governing Board of Ghana Integrated Iron & Steel Development Corporation (GIISDEC) and also serves  as the Chair of the Investments and Strategy Committee of the Board.

Personal life 
Fordjour is married and has three children, all girls. He is a Christian.

References 

http://johnfordjour.com/index.php/biography

Ghanaian MPs 2017–2021
1986 births
New Patriotic Party politicians
Living people
Ghanaian MPs 2021–2025